The 2003 Women's South American Volleyball Championship was the 25th edition of the South American Women's Volleyball Championship, organised by South America's governing volleyball body, the Confederación Sudamericana de Voleibol (CSV). It was held in Bogota, Colombia from September 4 to 6, 2003.

Teams

Play-off
Venue: Caracas, Venezuela

|}

|}

Peru and Venezuela played a qualification play-off, Brazil and Argentina played the final round automatically as best two in the previous edition and Colombia qualified as host.

Competition System
The competition system for the 2003 Women's South American Championship was a single Round-Robin system. Each team plays once against each of the 3 remaining teams. Points are accumulated during the whole tournament, and the final ranking is determined by the total points gained.

Standings

|}

Matches

|}

Final standing

References

Women's South American Volleyball Championships
South American Volleyball Championships
Volleyball
V
2003 in South American sport
September 2003 sports events in South America